Gradwell is a surname. Notable people with the surname include:

Charmian Gradwell, British actress, works in the television game show The Adventure Game
Leo Gradwell, a veteran of the disaster of Convoy PQ 17 and a British barrister and magistrate
Robert Gradwell (1777–1833), English Catholic bishop
William Gradwell-Goodwin (died 1942), the Mayor of Newcastle-under-Lyme, Staffordshire, England, from 1913 to the 1920s